Cerignola Campagna, sometimes shortened as Cerignola, is a railway station in the Italian town of Cerignola, in the Province of Foggia, Apulia. The station lies on the Adriatic Railway (Ancona–Lecce). The train services are operated by Trenitalia.

Train services
The station is served by the following service(s):

Regional services (Treno regionale) Foggia - Barletta - Bari

See also
Railway stations in Italy
List of railway stations in Apulia
Rail transport in Italy
History of rail transport in Italy

External links

This article is based upon a translation of the Italian language version as at June 2014.

Railway stations in Apulia
Railway station
Buildings and structures in the Province of Foggia